Nayan Raj Pandey is a Nepali writer and screenwriter. He writes stories and novels, as well as screenplays for Nepali cinema. He is known for his representation of contemporary Nepalese society in his novels, presented in a figurative style. He received the Padmashree Sahitya Puraskar for his autobiographical book Yaar in 2017. Ulaar, Loo, Ghamkiri, and Sallipir are Pandey’s popular novels.

Early life and education 
He was born on June ,1966 in Pyukha Tole, Kathmandu to Dilli Raj Pandey a civil servant in Department of Information and Bhagbati Devi Pandey, a housewife. After his father was appointed Headmaster at a school in Nepalgunj, the family moved there where the writer spend most of his childhood. He also obtained his School Leaving Certificate and higher secondary education in Nepalgunj. His father's collection of books and interest in literature piqued his interest towards reading.

Professional life 
He moved to Kathmandu in 1987 to pursue Bachelor of Law degree. He earned his degree from Nepal Law Campus in 1991. After earning his degree, he chose to make his mark through writing. Majority of his works are centered around the socio-economic situation of Nepalgunj and southern plains of Mid-Western region of Nepal.

Notable works

Novels 
Nango Manchheko Diary (1987)
Bikramaditya Euta Suun Kath (1987)
Atirikta (1993) 
Ular (1998)
 Loo (2011)
Ghamkiri (2013)
 Sallipir (2016)

Short stories collection 

 Nidaye Jagadamba (2008)
 Khor Bhitra ko Joker 
 Chocolate (2013)
 Jiyara (2021)

Autobiography 

 Yaar (2017)

Screenplay 

 Afno Ghar Afno Manchhe (2001)
 Basain (2005)
 Maina (2008)
 Dancing on the Fire: Khali Khaney (Video documentary short) (2011)

Awards 
Pandey has received multiple awards for his contribution to film and literature fields. Some of the awards are:

 Best Drama Writing Prize 1988 by Nepal Pragya Pratisthan
 National Talent Award 1996 (2053 BS)
 Lokendra Literary Award 2001
 Motion Picture Award for Best Screenplay 2001
 Garima Prize 2005, awarded by Sajha Prakashan
 National Prize for Best Screenplay- Maina (Nepali film)
 The Diamond Shamsher Memorial Literary Award 2011
 Padmashree Sahitya Puraskar, 2018 (2074 BS) for Yaar
 Karnali Sahitya Samaj Kriti Puraskar, 2020 (2077 BS) for Jiyara

His autobiographical work, Yaar was shortlisted for Madan Puraskar (2074 BS).

Personal life 
He is married to Sanu Pandey and has two sons.

References

Living people
1966 births
Nepali-language writers
20th-century Nepalese male writers
Padmashree Sahitya Puraskar winners
21st-century Nepalese male writers
People from Kathmandu
Nepalese screenwriters
Nepal Law Campus alumni
Nepalese columnists